Jonathan Glassner is a television writer, director, and producer.  He is known for his involvement with Stargate SG-1 (where he was executive producer for the first three seasons) and The Outer Limits. Glassner was initially noticed as a writer for his work on Alfred Hitchcock Presents.  After writing for several television series, including 21 Jump Street, Glassner moved on to The Outer Limits, which naturally segued into his involvement with Stargate SG-1 as a staff writer and executive producer.  His most recent work is as a writer and director for CSI: Miami, CSI: NY, and other shows.  He was also a co-executive producer on the NBC show Heist and the Fox show Standoff, as well as for Sci-Fi Channel's The Invisible Man.

While at Northwestern University, Glassner also played a leading role in the development and production of Rising Stars, which became the model upon which Star Search was developed. He moved to Los Angeles to become a director and was told that the best way to accomplish that was to start out as a writer. He eventually had enough scripts accepted that he could hire himself as director.

Filmography

Film

Television 
The numbers in directing and writing credits refer to the number of episodes.

References

External links

American television directors
American television producers
American television writers
American male television writers
Living people
Place of birth missing (living people)
Year of birth missing (living people)